This is a list of current and upcoming programs that are to be broadcast by Jeepney TV, a Philippine pay television owned by Creative Programs, a subsidiary of ABS-CBN.

Current Programming

Drama
Dream Dad† (2014-2015)
Galema: Anak ni Zuma† (2013-2014)
Got to Believe† (2013-2014)
Kristine† (2010-2011)
Imortal† (2010-2011)
Ipaglaban Mo (2014–2020)
Love Thy Woman (2020)
Ningning† (2015)
Nang Ngumiti ang Langit† (2019)
May Isang Pangarap† (2013)
Playhouse† (2018-2019)
Saan Ka Man Naroroon† (1999-2001)
The Good Son† (2017–2018)
Two Wives† (2014-2015)
Ysabella† (2007-2008)
You're My Home† (2015-2016)

Fantasy/Horror
Momay† (2010)
Wansapanataym Presents (2010-2019)

Comedy
Goin' Bulilit (2005–2019)

Variety/musical and talk shows
ASAP Remix (1995–present)

Kid-oriented
Parent Experiment (2022-present)
Team Yey! (Famtime) (2022-present)

Anime series
Anne of Green Gables (2023-present)
Remi, Nobody's Girl (2022-present)

Cartoons
Robocar Poli (2022-present)

Channel-produced programs
Kumu Star Ka (2021-present, also simulcast with TeleRadyo)
Travel and Kach (2022-present)
Proyekto Pilipino (2022-present)

Local programs from ABS-CBN Entertainment

Daily afternoon variety
ASAP Natin 'To (1995–present) (Same day live simulcast from Kapamilya Channel, A2Z and TV5; encore primetime telecast on Metro Channel.)
It's Showtime (2009–present) (Same day live simulcast from Kapamilya Channel, A2Z and TV5.)

Daily primetime local drama
(Same night simulcast from Kapamilya Channel, A2Z and TV5.)
Dirty Linen (2023-present)
The Iron Heart (2022-present)

Religious shows
Kapamilya Daily Mass (2020-present)
Kapamilya Sunday Mass (2020-present)
Kapamilya Journey's Hope (2020-present)
The Healing Eucharist Sunday TV Mass (2012–present) (delayed telecast from Kapamilya Channel, TeleRadyo and The Healing Eucharist official YouTube channel)

Movie block
Pasada Pelikula (2017–present)
Kid Sine Presents (2021-present)

Previous Programming

Local Dramas

100 Days to Heaven (2011)
2 Good 2 Be True (2022)
Annaliza (2013-2014)
Apoy sa Dagat (2013)
And I Love You So (2015-2016)
Angelito: Batang Ama (2011-2012)
Ang Munting Paraiso (1999-2002)
Ang sa Iyo ay Akin (2020-2021)
A Beautiful Affair (2012-2013)
A Family Affair (2022)
A Love to Last (2017)
All of Me (2015-2016)
Angelito: Ang Bagong Yugto (2012)
Basta't Kasama Kita (2003-2004)
Born for You (2016)
Be Careful With My Heart (2012-2014)
Bagito (2014-2015)
Be My Lady (2016)
The Best of MMK (1991-present)
The Best of Ipaglaban Mo (2014-2020)
Budoy (2011-2012)
Bukas na Lang Kita Mamahalin (2013)
Calla Lily (2006)
 Crazy for You (2006)
Dahil May Isang Ikaw (2009-2010)
Dolce Amore (2016)
Dahil sa Pag-ibig (2012)
Dream Dad (2014-2015)
Dugong Buhay (2013)
Doble Kara (2015–2017)
Dyosa (2008-2009)
Eva Fonda (2008-2009)
Familia Zaragoza (1995–1996)
Florinda (2009)
FlordeLiza (2015)
Forevermore (2014–2015)
FPJ's Ang Probinsyano: Ang Simula (seasons 1 to 4) (2015-2022)
Flower of Evil (2022)
Green Rose (2011)
Give Love on Christmas (2014-2015)
Guns and Roses (2011)
Gulong ng Palad (2006)
Hiram na Mukha (2007)
Habang May Buhay (2010)
Hawak Kamay (2014)
Halik (2018-2019)
Hanggang Saan (2017-2018)
Hiram (2004-2005)
Huwag Ka Lang Mawawala (2013)
Honesto (2013-2014)
Huwag Kang Mangamba (2021)
Ikaw ang Lahat sa Akin (2005)
Iisa Pa Lamang (2008)
Ina, Kapatid, Anak (2012-2013)
Ikaw ay Pag-Ibig (2011-2012)
Ikaw Lamang (2014)
Imortal (2010-2011)
It Might Be You (2003-2004)
Ikaw Lang Ang Iibigin (2017–2018)
Init sa Magdamag (2021)
Juan dela Cruz (2013)
Kahit Isang Saglit (2008)
Kay Tagal Kang Hinintay (2002-2003)
Kambal sa Uma (2009)
Katorse (2009-2010)
Kung Ako'y Iiwan Mo (2012)
Kung Tayo'y Magkakalayo (2010)
Kadenang Ginto (2018–2020)
La Luna Sangre (2017–2018)
La Vida Lena (2021-2022)
Langit Lupa (2016-2017)
Lobo (2008)
Love in 40 Days (2022)
Lovers in Paris (2009)
Lorenzo's Time (2012)
Maalaala Mo Kaya (1991-2022)
Maging Sino Ka Man (2006-2007)
Maging Sino Ka Man: Ang Pagbabalik (2007-2008)
Magpahanggang Wakas (2016-2017)
Mara Clara (2010–2011)
Maria Flordeluna (2007)
May Minamahal (2007)
May Bukas Pa (2009)
Magkaribal (2010)
Minsan Lang Kita Iibigin (2011)
My Little Juan (2013)
Mirabella (2014)
My Dear Heart (2017)
Mga Anghel na Walang Langit (2005–2006)
Mula sa Puso (original)  (1997-1999)
Mula sa Puso (remake)  (2011)
My Binondo Girl (2011-2012)
Muling Buksan ang Puso (2013)
My Girl (remake) (2008)
Marry Me, Marry You (2021-2022)
Ngayon at Kailanman (2018-2019)
Nathaniel (2015)
Natutulog Ba ang Diyos? (2007)
Nagsimula sa Puso (2009-2010)
Nasaan Ka Nang Kailangan Kita (2015)
Oh My G! (2015)
On the Wings of Love (2015-2016)
Only You (2009)
Palimos ng Pag-ibig (2007)
Prinsesa ng Banyera (2007-2008)
Pangako Sa 'Yo (original)  (2000-2002)
Pangako Sa 'Yo (remake)  (2015–2016)
Pangarap na Bituin (2007)
Pasión de Amor (2015–2016)
Pieta (2008-2009)
Precious Hearts Romances Presents Collection 
Araw Gabi (2018)
Bud Brothers (2009)
Impostor (2010)
Los Bastardos (2018-2019)
My Cheating Heart (2009-2010)
Paraiso (2012)
Pintada (2012)
Quikilig! (2010)
Somewhere in My Heart (2009)
Princess and I (2012–2013)
Pure Love (2014)
Pusong Ligaw (2017–2018)
Rubi (2010)
Sa Puso Ko Iingatan Ka (2001–2003)
Sa Sandaling Kailangan Mo Ako (1998-1999)
Sa Piling Mo (2006)
Sana Maulit Muli (2007)
Sana Bukas pa ang Kahapon (2014)
Sandugo (2019-2020)
Sana Dalawa ang Puso (2018)
Since I Found You (2018)
Sino ang Maysala?: Mea Culpa (2019)
Star Drama Presents (1993-2001)
Tanging Yaman (2010)
Tayong Dalawa (2009)
The Better Half (2017)
The Broken Marriage Vow (2022)
The General's Daughter (2019)
The Greatest Love (2016-2017)
The Haunted (2019-2020)
The Killer Bride (2019-2020)
The Legal Wife (2014)
The Promise of Forever (2017)
The Story of Us (2016)
The Wedding (2009)
Till I Met You (2016-2017)
Tubig at Langis (2016)
Walang Hanggan (2012)
Walang Hanggang Paalam (2020-2021)
Widlflower (2017–2018)
Vietnam Rose (2005–2006)
Viral Scandal (2021-2022)
Your Song (2006-2011)
Boystown (2009)
Ysabella (2007-2008)

Fantasy/Horror

Agimat: Ang Mga Alamat ni Ramon Revilla (2009-2011)
Agua Bendita (2010)
Aryana (2012-2013)
Carlo J. Caparas': Panday (2005-2006) 
Bagani (2018)
Da Adventures of Pedro Penduko (2007)
Dyesebel (2014)
Hiwaga ng Kambat (2019)
Inday Bote (2015)
Juan dela Cruz (2013)
Kampanerang Kuba (2005)
Komiks presents: Wakasan (2006-2009)
Kokey (2007)
Kokey @ Ako (2010)
Krystala (2004-2005)
Kung Fu Kids (2008)
Lastikman (2007)
Little Champ (2013)
Maligno (2008)
Marina (2004)
Momay (2010)
Mutya (2011)
Nginiig (2004-2006)
Noah (2010-2011)
Patayin Sa Sindak Si Barbara (2008)
!Oka Tokat (1997–2002)
Princess Sarah (2007)
Spirits (2004-2005)
Super Inggo (2006-2007)
Super Inggo 1.5: Ang Bagong Bangis (2007)
Starla (2019-2020)
Wansapanataym Classics (1997-2005)
WansapanaSummer (2013-2015)

Comedy

Abangan Ang Susunod Na Kabanata (1991-1997)
Ang Tanging Ina (2003-2005)
Arriba, Arriba! (2000-2003)
Banana Split (Season 1) (2008-2011)
Banana Split: Extra Scoop (2011–2015)
Banana Sundae: Rescoop (2015–present)
Bida si Mister, Bida si Misis (2002-2005)
Bora: Sons of the Beach (2005–2006)
Chika Chika Chicks (1987–1991)
George and Cecil (2009-2010)
Goin' Bananas (1987–1991)
Home Along Da Riles (1992–2003)
John en Shirley (2006-2007)
Klasmeyts (2001-2003)
OK Fine, Whatever (2002-2006)
Oki Doki Doc (1993-2000)
Onli In Da Pilipins (1997-1998)
Palibhasa Lalake (1987–1998)
Pwedeng Pwede (1999-2001)
Quizon Avenue (2005-2006)
Richard Loves Lucy (1998-2001)
Super Laff-In (1996-1999)
Tarajing Potpot (1999-2000)
Toda Max (2011–2013)
Volta (2008)
Whattamen (2001-2004)

Youth-oriented Programs

Ang TV (1992-1997)
G-mik (1999–2002)
Gimik (1996-1999)
Goin' Bulilit Classics (2005–2019)
Growing Up (2011-2012)
Tabing Ilog (1999-2003)

Game and Reality Shows

Bet on Your Baby (2013–2014, 2014–2015, 2017)
Celebrity Playtime (2015-2016)
Dance Kids (2015)
Family Feud (2016–2017)
I Can Do That (2017)
I Can See Your Voice (season 1) (2017-2019); (season 2) (2019-2020); (season 3) (2020-2021); and (season 4) (2021-2022)
I Dare You (2011, 2013)
I Love OPM (2016)
Kapamilya, Deal or No Deal (season 5) (2015-2016)
Little Big Shots (2017)
Milyon Milyon Na, Game Ka Na Ba? (2002–2003)
Next Level Na, Game Ka Na Ba? (2003-2004)
Pilipinas Got Talent (season 5) (2016) and (season 6) (2018)
Pinoy Big Brother: Otso (2018-2019)
Pinoy Big Brother Revisited: Celebrity Edition (season 1) (2006)
Pinoy Big Brother Revisited: Teen Edition Season 1 (2006)
Pinoy Big Brother: Connect (2020-2021)
Pinoy Big Brother: Kumunity Season 10 (2021–2022)
Pinoy Bingo Night (2009)
Pilipinas, Game Ka Na Ba? (2007–2009)
Panahon Ko 'To!: Ang Game Show ng Buhay Ko (2010)
StarDance (2005)
The Singing Bee (Seasons 6 to 7) (2013–2015)
The Kids Choice (2018)
We Love OPM (2016)
World of Dance Philippines (season 1) (2019)
Your Face Sounds Familiar Kids (season 2) (2018)

Variety/Musical and Talk Shows
The Best of Gandang Gabi, Vice! (2011-2020)
The Best of The Sharon Cuneta Show (1988-1997)
Tatak Pilipino (1990–1995)
Tonight with Dick & Carmi (1988-1991)

U.S. TV Series
Baywatch (1990-1996) 
Jane the Virgin (2016)

Japanese Programs/Anime
Hero Zone (2018)
KonoSuba (2017)
New Initial D Trilogy (2017)
Yu-Gi-Oh! Arc-V (2016)
Lakbay Japan (2014-2015)
Asuko March (2015)
Barasu (2015)
The Before and After (2015)
Fukuoka Love Stories (2015)
He's Beautiful (Japan) (2015)
I'll Still Love You 10 Years from Now (2014)
Partners By Blood (2015)
Please Eat This (2015)
Starman (2016)
Takeshi's Medical Check-Up (2014)

Korean and Taiwanese dramas

A Promise of a Thousand Days (2013)
Angel Eyes (2014)
Blade Man (2016) 
Blood (2016)
Boys Over Flowers (2009)
Cheongdam-dong Alice (2017)
Cunning Single Lady (2017)
Doctor Stranger (2017)
Emergency Couple (2017)
Night: War of Brilliant Splendours (2022-2023)
Fated to Love You (Korean version) (2015)
Flower Crew: Joseon Marriage Agency (2020)
A Gentleman's Dignity (2012)
Good Doctor (2017)
Heard It Through the Grapevine (2018)
The Heirs (2014)
Hotel del Luna (2019-2020)
Hyde Jekyll, Me (2017)
I Have a Lover (2019-2020)
It's Okay, That's Love (2017)
The K2 (2016)
The King in Love (2018)
Love in the Moonlight (2017)
My Lovely Girl (2015)
Let's Get Married (2015)
Love in Sadness (2020)
Lovers in Paris (original) (2004)
Mask (2018)
Meteor Garden (2003)
Meteor Garden II (2003)
Meteor Rain (2003)
My Girl (original) (2006)
My Girlfriend is a Gumiho (2011)
Miss Ripley (2014)
Meow, The Secret Boy (2021)
My Love Donna (2016)
Oh My Lady! (2018)
Ohlala Couple (2013)
Orange Marmalade (2016-2017)
Princess Hours (2006)
Protect the Boss (2011)
Pure Love (original) (2011)
Rooftop Prince (2013)
Sensory Couple (2016)
The Thorn Birds (2015)
Two Wives (original) (2012-2013)
Twenty Again (2017)
Touch Your Heart (2019-2020)
Unforgettable Love (2015)
Warm and Cozy (2018)
When a Man Falls in Love (2013-2014)
Winter Sonata (2015)

Movie blocks

Back To The Movies (2015-2016)
FPJ: Da King Magpakailanman (2013-2018)
Knockout Avenue (2018)
Let's Go Linggo (2012-2015)
Pasada Astig (2016-2017)
Reteatro (2012-2014, 2015-2016)
Sunday Hi-Way (2015-2017)
Tatak James Bond (2017-2018)

Current affairs
Swak na Swak (produced by Bayan Productions; 2006–2021)

Cartoons
Wakakusa no Charlotte (2022)
The Garfield Show (season 3) (2022)
The Trapp Family Singers (2022)
Johnny Test (2021)
Little Women II (2022)
Juddy Aboutt (2022)
Peter Pan and Weddy (2022)
Max Steel (2021-2022)
Marco (2022)
Kongsuni (2021-2022)

Channel-produced programs
Ask Angelica (2020)
B.T.S. (2014–2017)
Biyaheng Retro (2013–2017)
Biyaheng Retro 2.0. (2022)
God Vibes with Edu (2020)
Game KNB? (2022)
I Feel U (2020-2021) (produced by ABS-CBN Films, ABS-CBN Music and The Filipino Channel)
JTV Star Showcase (2013–2018)
Jeepney TV Fan Favorite Awards Showcase (2022-2023)
Laugh Laban (2021-2022)
Real Talk: The Heart of the Matter (2021-present)
The Best Talk (2021)
Showbiz Pa More! (2018–2021)
We Rise Togheter (2020-2022)
Showbiz Play Pa More (2021-2022)

Television programs from ABS-CBN Entertainment (including ABS-CBN Current Affairs)

Weekday Mornings/Afternoon Current Affairs
(Exclusive for TeleRadyo only. Re-runs due to shutdown of ABS-CBN broadcast stations due to expired franchise.)

DocuCentral Presents (2019)
Failon Ngayon (2009–2020)
Kuha Mo! (2019-2020)
Matanglawin (2008–2020)
Pareng Partners (2018–2019)
Local Legends (2019-2020)
Mission Possible (2015–2020)
My Puhunan (2015–2020)
#NoFilter (2019-2020)
Rated K (2004–2020)
Red Alert (2014-2019)
Sports U (2015–2020)
TNT: Tapatan ni Tunying (2013–2019)

Daily Afternoon/Evening Variety
(Exclusive for ABS-CBN only, due to shutdown of ABS-CBN broadcast stations due to expired franchise except with live telecast exclusive for Kapamilya Channel)

ASAP Natin 'To: Encore (1995–present) (encore telecast from ABS-CBN, 1 week delayed)
It's Showtime Tonight (2009–present) (encore telecast from Kapamilya Channel, A2Z and TV5)
Magandang Buhay: Momshies sa Hapon (2016–present) (encore telecast from ABS-CBN)

Weekly Documentary Series
(Same day simulcast from Kapamilya Channel and A2Z)

Iba 'Yan! (2020-2021)
Paano Kita Mapasasalamatan? (2020-2021)

Infomercials
O Shopping (2020)

Free TV Channel
Jeepney TV sa Studio 23 (2012-2014)

Jeepney TV on YouTube 
Jeepney TV also aired with some classic ABS-CBN shows on YouTube.

Aalog-Alog (2006-2007)
Agimat: Ang Mga Alamat ni Ramon Revilla (2009-2011)
Agua Bendita (2010)

Ang Tanging Ina (2003–2005)
Bora (2005-2006)
Calvento Files (1995-1998)

Esperanza (1997–1999)
George and Cecil (2009-2010)
Gimik (1996-1999)
G-Mik (1999-2002)
Home Along Da Riles (1992-2003)
Judy Ann Drama Special (1999-2001)
 Kapag May Katwiran... Ipaglaban Mo! (1992-1999)
Kambal sa Uma (2009)
Kampanerang Kuba (2005)
Komiks (2006-2008)
Kokey (2007)
Kokey @ Ako (2010)
Kung Fu Kids (2008)
Krystala (2004-2005)
Lastikman (2007)
Let's Go (2006-2007)
Lorenzo's Time (2012)
Love Spell (2006-2008)
 Mara Clara (1992-1997) 
Marina (2004)
Marinella (1999-2001)
Maligno (2008)
Mula sa Puso (1997-1999)
Mutya (2011)
My Little Juan (2013)
Mary D' Potter (2001-2002)
Noah (2010-2011)
Oka2kat (2012)
!Oka Tokat (1997-2002)
Oki Doki Doc (1993-2000)
Palibhasa Lalake (1987-1998)
Panday (2005)
 Princess Sarah (2007)
Recuerdo de Amor (2001-2003)
Rosalka (2010)
Rounin (2007)
Sineserye Presents: Florinda (2009)
Sineserye Presents: Hiram na Mukha (2007)         
Sineserye Presents: Patayin sa Sindak si Barbara (2008)
Star Drama Theater Presents (1993-2001)
Super Inggo (2006-2007)
 Spirits (2004–2005)
 Tayong Dalawa (2009)
Volta (2008)
Wansapanataym Classics (1997-2005)
Note: Some shows listed here like Aalog-Alog and Kaya ni Mister, Kaya ni Misis only have fastcuts of episodes or have a separate playlists which contain full episodes and fastcuts.

Specials

Dolphy: Song and Dance Man (December 16, 2012)
Whattamen Reunited (March 24, 2013)
Nova's Star: Ilaw ng Komedya (April 28, 2013)
Edgar Mortiz: Goin' for Gold (May 26, 2013)
Judy Ann Santos: Her Royal Journey on TV (June 16, 2013)
Dolphy: Hari ng Komedya (July 7, 2013)
Bea Alonzo: Beyond Beauty (August 25, 2013)
Angelica Panganiban: Soaring High (September 29, 2013)
The Rise of Dawn (October 27, 2013)
Piolo Pascual: His Miracle Life (November 24, 2013)
Kapamilya Throwback Christmas: Mga Awit ng Pasko (December 22, 2013)
2014 ABS-CBN's Countdown to Chinese New Year (January 30, 2014)
Annestoppable (February 23, 2014)
Meteor Fever 4ever (March 30, 2014)
Limang DICKada (May 25, 2014)
Ryan Ryan Musikahan: Home For Christmas (December 14, 2014)
Ryan Ryan Musikahan: Piyano at Gitara (August 15, 2015)
Ryan Ryan Musikahan: Christmas From the Heart (December 5, 2015)
Para sa Bayan: A Ryan Ryan Musikahan (June 11, 2016)
2016 Goodbye 2017 Hello ABS-CBN News and Public Affairs (January 1, 2017)
Pantawid ng Pag-ibig: At Home Together Concert (March 22, 2020) (together with ABS-CBN, S+A, ANC, DZMM Radyo Patrol 630, DZMM Teleradyo, Asianovela Channel, Metro Channel, MOR Philippines, iWant, TFC, and Myx)
Kapit Bisig Week (June 27 to July 3, 2020) (special preview from 8 selected programs from Kapamilya Channel)
Napapanahong Bayani: A Gawad Genny Lopez Jr.’s Bayaning Pilipino Special (August 8 and 9, 2020)
La Vida Lena: 2 Week Catch-Up Marathon (August 15 to 29, 2021)

See also
List of programs aired by Kapamilya Channel
List of programs aired by Kapamilya Online Live
List of programs broadcast by All TV
List of ABS-CBN drama series

References

Jeepney TV
Jeepney TV